Stellar wind is the flow of particles from the atmosphere of stars.

Stellar wind may also refer to:

Stellar Wind, the code name for certain United States government information collection activities
Solar wind, stellar winds emitted by Earth's sun
Stellar Wind (horse), A Thoroughbred racehorse

See also
 Solar wind (disambiguation)